Elsah is a village in Jersey County, Illinois. As of the 2020 census, the village had a total population of 519. Michael Pitchford is the village's current acting mayor.

It is the home of Principia College.

Elsah is a part of the Metro-East region and the St. Louis Metropolitan Statistical Area.

Geography
Elsah is located at  (38.953720, -90.354732).

History 
James Semple, a local lawyer, prominent politician and United States Senator from Illinois, founded Elsah in 1853 and offered free lots to anyone who built houses with stone from his quarry. It is believed that he named the village of Elsah after Ailsa Craig, the last outcropping his family saw as they departed Scotland for the United States.  By 1861, the village had grown to its current size, as geographic and economic limitations prevented further expansion.

Although Elsah has been described as the "New England of the Midwest," the village is not a New England prototype derived from 18th century colonial styles. Rather, the architecture found in Elsah demonstrates 19th century styles and fashions including Greek Revival, Gothic Revival, Mansard, Italianate, Saltbox, and Gambrel. Elsah prospered as the main shipping point for the agricultural goods produced by the farmers of Jersey County. The village's importance diminished with the coming of the railroad, later being revitalized when Principia College was established in the 1930s.

Eliestoun House was completed in 1890 by Alexander Wadsworth Longfellow Jr. The house is on the grounds of Principia College and named after "'Elliestoun Tower' on Castle Semple Loch" which is part of the Lands of Elliston in Scotland. Henry Turner and his wife Ada Ames had the house built. Ada is a descendant of James Semple.

Elsah remained mainly a quiet village until the opening of the Great River Road (Illinois Route 100) in 1964. Elsah is a community whose homes are privately owned. In 1973, the entire village was placed on the National Register of Historic Places.

The Great Flood of 1993 caused significant damage to many of the village's structures.

The historic commercial district on LaSalle Street, which extends three blocks inward from the river, consists mainly of stone buildings; all but one of its pre-1861 buildings, including all four of the village's historic taverns, still stand. The other two districts are both located on Mill Street and are primarily residential; the larger one is three blocks long and has an assortment of stone and brick houses, while the smaller section has a single block of Greek Revival homes.

Today, Elsah's proximity to bald eagle watching locations make it a popular destination during the fall and winter seasons. Elsah's location on the Sam Vadalabene Bike Trail also makes it a popular stop for bicyclists enjoying the Great River Road in any season.

Demographics

	

As of the census of 2000, there were 635 people, 69 households, and 40 families residing in the village. The racial makeup of the village was 90.08% White, 4.25% African American, 0.63% Native American, 0.79% Asian, 0.16% Pacific Islander, 1.42% from other races, and 2.68% from two or more races. Hispanic or Latino of any race were 3.31% of the population.

There were 69 households, out of which 23.2% had children under the age of 18 living with them, 49.3% were married couples living together, 8.7% had a female householder with no husband present, and 40.6% were non-families. 40.6% of all households were made up of individuals, and 13.0% had someone living alone who was 65 years of age or older.  The average household size was 2.04 and the average family size was 2.71.

In the village, the population was spread out, with 4.6% under the age of 18, 77.0% from 18 to 24, 6.3% from 25 to 44, 8.0% from 45 to 64, and 4.1% who were 65 years of age or older.  The median age was 21 years. For every 100 females, there were 84.1 males.  For every 100 females age 18 and over, there were 83.6 males.

The median income for a household in the village was $57,083, and the median income for a family was $60,000. Males had a median income of $47,500 versus $26,964 for females. The per capita income for the village was $13,154.  None of the population or families were below the poverty line.

Education 

Elsah includes Principia College, a four-year liberal-arts private college for Christian Scientists. The campus area, known as the Principia College Historic District, was declared a National Historic Landmark in 1993, and was placed on the National Register of Historic Places that same year.

Geography 
The Meeting of the Great Rivers Scenic Byway passes through Elsah.
The Elsah area was also one of the two finalists for the site of the Air Force Academy in 1954.

Notable people
This article is about individuals from Elsah. For individuals who attended Principia College, see List of Principia College alumni.
Robert Duvall, Academy Award-winning actor, is an alumnus of Principia College in Elsah
Herbert G. Giberson, Illinois state senator and businessman
James Semple, United States Senator from Illinois, diplomat of New Granada, and founder of Elsah

See also 
Elsah Historic District
Principia Astronomical Observatory

References

External links
Village of Elsah website
Friends of Eliestoun website

Metro East
Villages in Jersey County, Illinois
Illinois populated places on the Mississippi River
Populated places established in 1853
1853 establishments in Illinois